Soloti is a rural locality (a selo) in Valuysky District, Belgorod Oblast, Russia. The population was 736 as of 2010. There are 24 streets.

History 

On 15 October 2022, at roughly 10:00 UTC+3, a mass shooting occurred on a training ground near Soloti by two perpetrators. 13 deaths were reported, including the perpetrators, and another 15 were wounded.

Geography 
Timonovo is the nearest rural locality.

References 

Rural localities in Valuysky District